Michigan's 15th Senate district is one of 38 districts in the Michigan Senate. The 15th district was created by the 1850 Michigan Constitution, as the 1835 constitution only permitted a maximum of eight senate districts. It has been represented by Democrat Jeff Irwin since 2023, succeeding Republican Jim Runestad.

Geography
District 15 encompasses parts of Lenawee, Monroe, and Washtenaw counties.

2011 Apportionment Plan
District 15, as dictated by the 2011 Apportionment Plan, covered western Oakland County in the outer suburbs of Detroit, including the communities of Novi, West Bloomfield Township, Commerce Township, White Lake Township, Wixom, Lyon Township, South Lyon, Walled Lake, and most of Northville.

The district overlapped with Michigan's 11th and 14th congressional districts, and with the 29th, 38th, 39th, 40th, and 44th districts of the Michigan House of Representatives.

List of senators

Recent election results

2018

2014

Federal and statewide results in District 15

Historical district boundaries

References 

15
Oakland County, Michigan